Kiyevsky (masculine), Kiyevskaya (feminine), or Kiyevskoye (neuter) is the name of several inhabited localities in Russia.

Urban localities
Kiyevsky, Moscow, an urban-type settlement formerly in Naro-Fominsky District of Moscow Oblast; transferred to the jurisdiction of the federal city of Moscow on July 1, 2012.

Rural localities
Kiyevsky, Kaluga Oblast, a settlement in Baryatinsky District of Kaluga Oblast
Kiyevsky, Tomsk Oblast, a settlement in Kargasoksky District of Tomsk Oblast
Kiyevsky, Volgograd Oblast, a khutor in Profsoyuzny Selsoviet of Danilovsky District of Volgograd Oblast
Kiyevskoye, Kaliningrad Oblast, a settlement in Kovrovsky Rural Okrug of Zelenogradsky District of Kaliningrad Oblast
Kiyevskoye, Krasnodar Krai, a selo in Kiyevsky Rural Okrug of Krymsky District of Krasnodar Krai
Kiyevskoye, Republic of North Ossetia–Alania, a selo in Kiyevsky Rural Okrug of Mozdoksky District of the Republic of North Ossetia–Alania
Kiyevskaya (rural locality), a village in Kumzersky Selsoviet of Kharovsky District of Vologda Oblast